The Berlagebrug is a bascule bridge over the river Amstel in Amsterdam, Netherlands. The bridge was commissioned by the municipality and named after its main architect Hendrikus Petrus Berlage (1856–1934). It was constructed from 1926 to 1931 and officially opened on 28 May 1932. It has been designated as a Rijksmonument (National Heritage Site) since 11 May 2008.

References

External links 

 

1931 establishments in the Netherlands
Bascule bridges
Bridges completed in 1931
Bridges in Amsterdam
20th-century architecture in the Netherlands